Paracleros staudei is a butterfly in the family Hesperiidae. It is found in western Kenya (the Kakamega Forest). The habitat consists of forests.

References

Butterflies described in 2000
Erionotini